Vespula consobrina, the blackjacket, is a species of stinging wasp in the family Vespidae.

References

Further reading

 
 

Vespidae
Articles created by Qbugbot